, ,  for short, is a fictional character in the Soulcalibur series of video games. Created by Namco's Project Soul division, she first appeared in Soulcalibur IV and its subsequent sequels, later appearing in various merchandise related to the series.

A princess in the fictional European country of Wolfkrone, in Soulcalibur IV she finds her kingdom under attack by Nightmare and his forces. With her father driven insane, she takes control of the kingdom's army and seeks to revive an ancient "Hero King", Algol, in order to bring peace to the land. In Soulcalibur: Broken Destiny, the game's Gauntlet storyline (non-canon) revolves around her search for ingredients necessary to cure her father, interacting with various characters in the series. As a video game character, Hilde's fighting style is unique to others in the Soul series, allowing players to "charge" attack command inputs to increase the strength of their offensive strikes.

Since her introduction, IGN heavily praised the character, citing her gameplay and stating approval for the contrast of her design against other female characters in the series. Other sources stated similar, with some such as Edge and Game Informer describing her as the best new character introduced in the game or its predecessor, Soulcalibur III.

Conception and design
Hilde's look derived from the development team's desire to make a fully clothed "sexy" female character for Soulcalibur IV, and encasing her in armor as a result. Her characteristics and personality were developed after deciding what weapons she would use, a spear and short sword. While fully armored, they endeavored to keep her appearing feminine, shaping the appearance of the armor thus and giving "peeks" of her figure beneath it. When it was pointed out to lead animator Yusuke Shibata that her short sword and related attacks appeared to display her femininity, he agreed, though added that her spear was another matter entirely. After developing her appearance and character model, her backstory was developed by a team led by Yoshihiro Nakagawa, and during this process they worked out how to tie Hilde into the plot of the series. In interviews, Soulcalibur IV director Katsutoshi Sasaki has called Hilde "the 'most alluring'" female character in the title, designed as an opposite to characters such as Ivy and characters that "always have their boobs popping out". He added that he felt that as gaming became more accepted, characters similar to Hilde would become more common.

Hilde appears as a slender woman with long, red hair. Her primary appearance encases her fully in form-fitting body armor, with red and black fabric underneath. A wolf's head, the character's family symbol, extends from the right pauldron and covers her helmet's visor, while the left pauldron is covered by red fabric, fastened to the center of her breastplate's collar underneath a large brooch. Beneath the armor, a red coat covers her torso, the tail of which extends past her waist. Her alternate character design consists of a long, blue dress, extending to her feet and neck, exposing her shoulders and angled towards her right leg. White gloves, shoes, and stockings cover her arms and legs, while a darker colored sash surrounds her waist and midsection, too angled to the right.

In video games
Hilde is the daughter of the king of Wolfkrone, a fictional European kingdom under assault by series antagonist Nightmare's forces. After her father was driven insane into a Malfested by the Evil Seed event brought upon by the cursed sword Soul Edge (which took place seven years before the events of Soulcalibur IV), Hilde was forced to take the throne of Wolfkrone despite her young age. She took the responsibilities to protect her people and lead her armies in the front lines against Nightmare. As a desperate measure, Hilde seeks the Sword of Resurrection, Soul Calibur, to bring back an ancient king who once restored peace to the world. She returns in Soulcalibur VI as the first DLC fighter of the 2nd season pass. In the new timeline, the mysterious Aval Organization where the new character Grøh belongs to had been a sworn allied force to Hilde's home kingdom for generations.

In Soulcalibur: Broken Destinys Gauntlet storyline, a non-canon side story set after the events of Soulcalibur IV, the plot revolves around Hilde and her ally Cassandra, who search for ingredients to develop a potion to cure Hilde's father. To this end they force the protagonist to assist them, and later recruit another person, Dampierre, after Hilde is briefly kidnapped.

Gameplay
Sasaki described her fighting style as revolving around her dual weapons, comparing her to previous series character Cervantes but with the combination of her spear and short sword weapons allowing for both long distance and close-quarters combat. Control of her weapons is mapped to different inputs from the player's controller, allowing the attacks to be combined and create different horizontal and vertical strikes. However, as a result at long range Hilde's attacks become limited to entirely linear strikes.

Several of her attacks can also be "charged" by holding controller inputs, a feature unique in the series to the character. Doing so results in a stronger blow, but also creates a window of vulnerability due to the delay, negatable by performing the controller input during other attacks. Hilde's strongest attack, Mystic Star and Moonlight Dance, can be triggered through this method and will be both unguardable and do a high amount of damage if they hit the opponent, though at the cost of a twenty-five second delay while charging the attack.

Promotion and reception
Hilde is visible on both Soulcalibur IV arcade joysticks for the Xbox 360 and PlayStation 3. To explain the new features of Soulcalibur IV, Namco released an omake manga featuring Hilde and Cassandra. Written in a humorous tone, Cassandra, representing a veteran of the series, "taught" Hilde about the game's features, while introducing the audience to aspects of Hilde's character. Hilde was featured in a promotional comic bundled with the North American release of Soulcalibur IVs Premium Edition. Drawn by Udon Entertainment for DC Comics, it served as a prelude to the events of the game.

IGN stated her armored appearance makes her more alluring, as well as commented on her gameplay. They additionally listed Hilde as one of the series' top ten fighters at number ten. They cited her as a fierce opponent and "hell of a lot of fun to control", adding "...we tend to sit up and take notice when a new character shows promise...we expect she'll stick around for the long haul." In a similar list, Complex enlisted the 20 best characters from the series, ranking her the 17th best character. Comparison was also made to the other female characters in the game such as Ivy, calling it a "stark contrast". Additional praise was given in their review of Soulcalibur IV, stating an approval of her design combined with her personality, and a preference for her over the game's unlockable characters.

Other publications have also praised the character. Game Informer called her the best of any of the new characters introduced in either Soul Calibur III or IV. Edge described her as the best of the new characters in Soulcalibur IV, calling her fighting style a worthy rival to another series character, Kilik. iafrica.com described her as the "standout newcomer" of the title, describing her fighting style as unusual and "unwieldy to watch", but easy to get into. Ars Technica also called her a standout addition to the game, describing her fighting style as good for skilled players. Good Game described her as an interesting character, and further named her "the hottest [...] girl in the game". Shacknews stated that her combination of close and long range attacks made for "a refreshingly dynamic fighting style". Topless Robot named her one of the "11 Most Dignified Videogame Heroines", suggesting that her presence in the game was added to offset the other female characters and praising the lack of "ridiculous romantic contrivances" in her character background. Neoseeker praised her design an "unbelievably awesome outfit", adding that despite the lack of exposed skin, "she will win you over". GameDaily featured her as one of their "Babes of the Week", stating approval for her contrast to the other females, and praised the contrast of her fighting style to other characters in the series.

References

Fantasy video game characters
Female characters in video games
Fictional people of the Holy Roman Empire
Fictional German people in video games
Fictional female martial artists
Fictional polearm and spearfighters
Fictional swordfighters in video games
Fictional knights in video games
Princess characters in video games
Soulcalibur series characters
Video game characters introduced in 2008
Woman soldier and warrior characters in video games
Namco protagonists